The Good Son vs. The Only Daughter (The Blemish Remixes) is a remix album by David Sylvian featuring his previous album Blemish. Despite the title, not all the pieces have been remixed; some songs have been re-recorded with new musicians.

Track listing 
All tracks composed by David Sylvian unless otherwise noted

 "The Only Daughter" (remixed by Ryoji Ikeda) – 5:49  
 "Blemish" (Sylvian, Chisholm) (remixed by Burnt Friedman) – 4:50  
 "The Heart Knows Better" (remixed by Sweet Billy Pilgrim) – 5:29  
 "A Fire in the Forest" (remixed by Readymade FC) – 5:05
 "The Good Son" (remixed by Yoshihiro Hanno) – 4:33  
 "Late Night Shopping" (Sylvian, Chisholm) (remixed by Burnt Friedman) – 2:51  
 "How Little We Need to be Happy" (remixed by Tatsuhiko Asano) – 4:35  
 "The Only Daughter" (remixed by Jan Bang and Erik Honoré) – 5:28
 "Blemish" (remixed by Akira Rabelais) – 10:10

Personnel
David Sylvian – composer, vocals, art director
Ryoji Ikeda – piano (1)
Jean-Paul Zanutel – cello (1)
Fabienne Dussenwart – flute (1)
Pascal Moreau – French horn (1)
Dominica Eyckmans – viola (1)
Wilbert Aerts – violin (1) 
Hayden Chisholm – clarinet (2, 6)
Alphonse Elsenburg – clarinet (3)
Nils Petter Molvær – trumpet (8)

Additional personnel
Chris Bigg – design
Atsushi Fukui – cover artwork
Yuka Fujii – artist Liaison

References 

David Sylvian albums
Samadhi Sound albums
2004 albums